YMA may refer to:

 Young Muslim Association, an organization for people of all ages that promotes Islam in America
 Mayo Airport, the IATA code for the airport in Canada
 Yilan Museum of Art, a museum in Yilan County, Taiwan
 Yma Súmac, a noted dramatic coloratura soprano of Peruvian origin, born September 13, 1922
 Young Mizo Association, an organization for the people of Mizo